Halo nevus (also known as "Leukoderma acquisitum centrifugum," "Perinevoid vitiligo," and "Sutton nevus") is a mole that is surrounded by a depigmented ring or 'halo'.

Presentation
Halo nevi are also known as Sutton's nevi, or leukoderma acquisitum centrifugum.  Halo nevi are named such because they are a mole (nevus) that is surrounded by an area of depigmentation that resembles a halo.

Halo nevi are associated with vitiligo.  Sometimes the pale (hypopigmented) areas will spontaneously regress, and pigment returns.

Causes
The formation of a halo surrounding a nevi is believed to occur when certain white blood cells called CD8+ T lymphocytes destroy the pigment-producing cells of the skin (melanocytes).  The cause for the attack is unknown.

Diagnosis

Treatment

As halo nevi are only of cosmetic significance, no treatment is required, and patients will be asymptomatic. Although halo nevi are harmless, it is important to monitor the lesion on regular basis. Watch out for any changes in appearance of existing or new halo nevi. If there is any change in appearance or is associated with pain, itch, and infection, a doctor should be consulted immediately to exclude the possibility of melanoma.

Epidemiology

Halo nevi are estimated to be present in approximately 1% of the general population, and are found to be more prevalent in people with vitiligo, malignant melanoma, or Turner syndrome.  All races and sexes are equally susceptible to this disease, although a familial tendency has been reported.  The average age of onset is in a person's teenage years.

See also
 Nevus
 List of cutaneous conditions

References

External links 

Melanocytic nevi and neoplasms